Hard Core Logo 2 is a 2010 Canadian drama film written and directed by Bruce McDonald. It is a sequel to McDonald's 1996 film, Hard Core Logo. Hard Core Logo 2 assumes the same filmmaking style as McDonald’s latter-mentioned cult classic Hard Core Logo. It is a faux-documentary that follows Bruce the filmmaker (Bruce McDonald) as he investigates a claim made by Care Failure of the band Die Mannequin. She claims to be possessed by the spirit of rock star Joe Dick (Hugh Dillon), a principal character in the original movie, who was shown to commit suicide near the close of the film. This sequel follows tensions between the principal characters, and the progression of Bruce the filmmaker's investigation into Care Failure’s channeling of the deceased rocker's spirit.

Cast
 Adrien Dorval as Rufus Mellon
 Care Failure as herself
 Dazzer Scott as himself
 Stacy Stray as himself
 Shannon Jardine as Liz Moore
 Sera-Lys McArthur as Jules
 Bruce McDonald as Bruce the Filmmaker
 Peter Moore as Simon Less
 Julian Richings as Bucky Haight
 Jodi Sadowsky as Nurse Lilly
 Paul Shull as Mr. Butterscotch

Release
Hard Core Logo 2 was released for the first time on December 4, 2010 at the 10th annual Whistler Film Festival in Vancouver. It was the first movie by an already significant Canadian director (McDonald) to have its world premier at the Whistler event. The category of competition this mockumentary sequel entered in was the Borsos Award for Best Canadian Feature Film. It was judged alongside five other Canadian films in this category, losing to The Whistleblower by Toronto's Larysa Kondracki.

Reception
Expectations were set high for Bruce McDonald when he released the second instalment of Hard Core Logo. This caused the film to receive mixed reviews, from those who compared it to the original. Following its release in 2010, it received some positive reviews, such as that of Katherine Monk, from Postmedia News. She writes that it is a film about "artistic inspiration, maintaining a pure creative heart and connecting with others through honest expression". Hard Core Logo 2 also garnered many negative reviews, such as that of Mathew Kumar, a critic for Exclaim. He writes that this film is a documentary of all the boring parts of music-making, unlike the first film, and then he says that it is a pathetic attempt at shocking the audience. The Globe and Mail later referred to the feature as giving the audience "no sense of urgency, desire, or necessity" to continue watching. The film received a 37 percent score on the film rating site Rotten Tomatoes.

References

External links
 
 

2010 films
2010 drama films
Canadian drama films
English-language Canadian films
Films directed by Bruce McDonald
Canadian mockumentary films
2010s English-language films
2010s Canadian films